Grant-Valkaria is a town in Brevard County, Florida. The town's population was 3,850 at the 2010 United States Census.

Grant-Valkaria is located south of Melbourne, between Palm Bay and Sebastian. It is part of the Palm Bay–Melbourne–Titusville Metropolitan Statistical Area.  Grant-Valkaria was incorporated as a town on July 25, 2006, by joining the two previously unincorporated communities of Grant and Valkaria. The ZIP code is 32949 (and portions of 32950, and 32909), and the area code is 321.

Geography

Surrounding areas
 Malabar 
 Indian River Lagoon; Floridana Beach 
 Palm Bay 
 Micco; Barefoot Bay

Demographics

Government
In 2007, the town had a taxable real estate base of $503.37 million.

The town charter reflects the reason for incorporation and calls for future development to be consistent with a rural and fishing village lifestyle that preserves the history and natural green spaces of the two communities. Government services are to be kept to a minimum, density kept low and lot sizes kept large.

History
The community of Grant was originally established in 1925, and it has a history as a fishing village, with agriculture also a part of both communities' histories.

The community name of Valkaria derives from Valkyrie, a warrior-maiden of Norse mythology.

A MISTRAM missile tracking system was built by the US Air Force here in the early 1960s.

Culture

The town has held the Grant Seafood Festival every year on the last weekend of February since 1966.  In 1968, then U.S. Vice-President Hubert Humphrey visited the Seafood Festival while campaigning for his 1968 presidential bid. The proceeds go towards college scholarships for local children, as well as summer break activities for the community's children.

The town has the historic Bensen House as well as the historic Jorgensen's General Store.

Transportation

 U.S. 1 – This US highway runs along the Indian River Lagoon.
 CR 507 – Locally known as Babcock Street, CR 507 forms the western boundaries of Grant-Valkaria.
 Palm Bay Parkway – A proposed highway of Palm Bay, which may terminate in Grant-Valkaria, at I-95. One of the planned intersections would be at Babcock Street.
 The Valkaria Airport serves small general aviation aircraft.

Notable people

 Billy Horschel, professional golfer, born in Grant

References

External links
 

Towns in Brevard County, Florida
Populated places established in 2006
Towns in Florida
Populated places on the Intracoastal Waterway in Florida